Adrian Vlas (born 12 January 1982) is a Romanian former football player who played as a goalkeeper. Vlas started his career at Farul Constanța, club for which he played almost his entire career. In 2015 after two seasons spent at Callatis Mangalia, Vlas announced his retirement and started a new career, as a goalkeeping coach.

References

External links

 
 

1982 births
Living people
Sportspeople from Constanța
Romanian footballers
Association football goalkeepers
Liga I players
Liga II players
FCV Farul Constanța players
FC Viitorul Constanța players
FC Callatis Mangalia players